The  is the presiding officer of the House of Councillors of Japan, and together with the Speaker of the House of Representatives, the President is also the head of the legislative branch of Japan. The President is elected by members of the House at the start of each session, and can serve two three-year terms, for a maximum of six years.

The current President of the House of Councillors is Hidehisa Otsuji, who took office on 3 August 2022.

Selection

The election of the President takes place on the day of the new session, under the moderation of the Secretary-General of the House. The President is elected by an anonymous vote, and must have at least half of the votes in order to take office. If no one gets over half of the votes, the top two candidates will be voted again, and if they get the same number of votes, the President is elected by a lottery. The Vice President is elected separately, in the same way.

Usually, the President is a senior member of the ruling party, and the Vice President is a senior member of the opposition party. The current President, Hidehisa Otsuji, is a member of the ruling Liberal Democratic Party, while the Vice President, Hiroyuki Nagahama, is a member of the Constitutional Democratic Party of Japan.

Powers and duties
According to Chapter III Article 19 of the Diet Law, the President "shall maintain order in the House, arrange its business, supervise its administration, and represent the House".

The President is also authorized to maintain order in the House chambers by exercising police power. Upon the President's request, police personnel are sent by the National Police Agency, and are placed under the President's direction. The President may then order arrest or removal of a member of the House or a visitor.

According to Chapter XIV Chapter 116 of the Diet law, when a member of the House of Councillors acts in a disorderly manner, the President can warn them or make them withdraw their statements. If the member does not obey these orders, the President can forbid the member to speak or make the member leave the chamber until the end of the proceedings. If the chamber goes out of control and becomes over chaotic, the President may also temporarily suspend or adjourn the sitting for the day.

List of presidents of the House of Councillors

List of vice presidents of the House of Councillors

References

 
Politics of Japan
Lists of political office-holders in Japan
1947 establishments in Japan